Prague 17 is a municipal district (městská část) in Prague. It is located in the western part of the city. It is formed by one cadastre Řepy. As of 2008, there were 25,365 inhabitants living in Prague 17.

The administrative district (správní obvod) of the same name consists of municipal districts Prague 17 and Zličín.

External links 
 Prague 17 - Řepy - Official homepage

Districts of Prague

cs:Řepy
nl:Praag 17-Řepy
sk:Řepy